Belt may refer to:

Apparel
 Belt (clothing), a leather or fabric band worn around the waist
 Championship belt, a type of trophy used primarily in combat sports
 Colored belts, such as a black belt or red belt, worn by martial arts practitioners to signify rank in the kyū ranking system

Geology
 A synonym for orogen (e.g. orogenic belt)
 Greenstone belt
 A large-scale linear or curved array of belt of igneous rocks (e.g. Transscandinavian Igneous Belt)
 A large-scale linear or curved array of mineral deposits (e.g. Bolivian tin belt)
 Metamorphic belt 
 Paired metamorphic belts

Mechanical and vehicular
 Belt (mechanical), a looped strip of material used to link multiple rotating shafts
 Conveyor belt, a device for transporting goods along a fixed track
 Belt manlift, a device for moving people between floors in a building or grain elevator.
 Seat belt, a safety device in automobiles and on the plane
 Timing belt, part of an internal combustion engine
 Serpentine belt, move accessories of a combustion engine.
 Belt track, a type of track used on Caterpillar-style vehicles
 Belt armor, a layer of heavy metal armor plated onto or within the outer hulls of warships
 Belt (firearms), a type of ammunition used in light machine guns, like the M240 and Mk 48.
 Steel Belt, a type of machinery part and conveyor's Steel Belt

Places
 Belt, North Holland
 Belt, Montana, United States
 Belt Parkway, a series of highways around New York City, United States
 Danish belts, several straits in and around Denmark:
 Great Belt
 Little Belt
 Fehmarn Belt
 Any of several informally defined elongated regions of the United States and elsewhere
 Belts, Yiddish name of Bălți, Moldova
 Il-Belt, Maltese name of Valletta, Malta

Astronomy
 Asteroid belt, a region of the solar system between Mars and Jupiter
 Gould Belt, a partial ring of stars representing the local spiral arm to which the Sun belongs
 Kuiper belt, a region of the solar system beyond the orbit of Neptune
 Orion's Belt

People with the surname
 Thomas Belt (1832–1878), English geologist and naturalist
 Francis Walter Belt (1862–1938), Australian naval commander, lawyer, and explorer
 Philip Belt (1927–2015), American piano builder
 Brandon Belt (born 1988), American baseball player
 Dustin Belt (born 1987), American musician, producer, and actor

Other uses
 Belting (music), a singing technique
 The Belt, a 1989 erotic drama film
 Judas belt, a firework
 Green belt, a policy and land use designation used in land use planning
 Belt problem, a mathematics problem
 Belt Supergroup, a group of Mesoproterozoic sedimentary rocks
 Belt Publishing, an American publisher

See also
 Balteus (disambiguation)
 :Category:Belts (clothing)
 Below the belt
 Beltway